John McNeill is an Australian actor, voice over artist and writer. He has worked in a wide variety of film, television, drama and stage productions and his plays have been performed at the Stables, Belvoir and Seymour Centre theatres in Sydney and best known for his role as Lennie McPherson in the television drama series Underbelly: A Tale of Two Cities and Underbelly: The Golden Mile.

Early life 
John was born in 1956 in Brisbane, Australia. A keen rugby player, he was also active in surf lifesaving – notably as Chief Instructor for Bilinga SLSC on Gold Coast, Queensland – and worked as a professional lifeguard for the Gold Coast City Council during university holidays. After graduating from the University of Queensland with degrees in Education and Human Movement (1977), he moved to Canberra where he taught Physical Education, Human Movement and Psychology. He also spent a year overseas where he worked as a surfing instructor in North Devon and a swimming instructor in Pennsylvania.

Teacher and music
In 1986 John began work as a live-in academic tutor at the Australian Institute of Sport, where he progressed to head the Education and Welfare Department of the AIS. During those Canberra years, John was the lead singer of local theatrical rock band Blood Money. He also co-wrote a number of their songs. He also worked as a singer-guitarist at the Old Canberra Inn and continued to write original material. His song "My Brother's Going To War" was used by the Troubador Theatre in their touring "Vietnam" show.

In 1990 John began acting in a variety of stage and cabaret productions in Canberra and in 1992 made the decision to continue his professional performance career in Sydney.

Professional career

Television

Doctor Doctor (Call Me Irresponsible, 2018), Harrow (Episode 7), Underbelly ('Tale Of Two Cities' and 'The Golden Mile') Rescue Special Ops, Rake, Crownies, Tricky Business, Gods of Wheat Street, World Animal Championships (as Sir Reginald Wrinklebottom), Home and Away, The Cut, All Saints, McLeod's Daughters, The Alice, Blue Murder, White Collar Blue, Young Lions, Heartbreak High, Scorched, Do Or Die, House of Bond.

Film

Kangaroo Jack (2003), Dirty Deeds (2002), Candy (2006), The View From Greenhaven, Burns Point, Passion (1999)

Stage

The Readers, The Dapto Chaser, Endgame, Of Mice and Men, Ruben Guthrie, Thrall, Away, Bondi Dreaming, Gary's House, Men Love and the Monkey Boy, Noir, Richard III, Henry V, King Lear, The Merchant of Venice, Anything Goes, The Glory of Living, The Last Roadhouse in Paradise, The Caribbean Tempest, Twelfth Night, Blue Eyes and Heels, Two Way Mirror, Fool For Love, Turnstiler, The Merry Wives of Windsor, plus a wide variety of TV Commercials and short films.

Playwright 
John's play 'Pikers' was produced at the Stables and Downstairs Belvoir Theatres and also was produced by the Berry Drama Group in Berry, NSW. John's short plays 'Jesus of Marrickville' and 'Dougie's Rules' were produced at Downstairs Belvoir and 'Slapping Leonard Cohen' was produced at the Seymour Centre.

In 2015 John is workshopping his play 'Crows'.

References

External links

Australian male actors
Living people
1956 births